The 2018–19 Valparaiso Crusaders men's basketball team represented Valparaiso University during the 2018–19 NCAA Division I men's basketball season. The Crusaders, led by third-year head coach Matt Lottich, played their home games at the Athletics–Recreation Center as second-year members of the Missouri Valley Conference. They finished the season 15–18, 7–11 in MVC play to finish in a tie for eighth place. As the No. 9 seed in the MVC tournament, they defeated Indiana State in the first round before losing to Loyola in the quarterfinals.

Previous season
The Crusaders finished the 2017–18 season  15–17, 6–12 in MVC play to finish in last place in their first season as members of the MVC. They lost in the first round of the Missouri Valley tournament to Missouri State.

Offseason

Departures

Incoming transfers

2018 recruiting class

Roster

Schedule and results

|-
!colspan=9 style=| Exhibition

|-
!colspan=9 style=| Non-conference regular season
|-

|-

|-

|-

|-

|-

|-

|-

|-

|-

|-

|-

|-

|-
!colspan=9 style=| MVC regular season

|-
!colspan=9 style=| MVC tournament

Source

References

Valparaiso
Valparaiso Beacons men's basketball seasons
Valparaiso Crusaders men's basketball
Valparaiso Crusaders men's basketball